Amanda Palmer & Friends Present Forty-Five Degrees: Bushfire Charity Flash Record is a collaborative studio album by American singer-songwriter Amanda Palmer along with Brian Viglione, Clare Bowditch, Fred Leone, Missy Higgins, Jherek Bischoff, and Montaigne. It was released to digital retailers and streaming platforms on February 21, 2020. Released in response to the 2019–20 Australian bushfire season, all proceeds of the album will be donated to Firesticks Alliance, an Indigenous Australian-led organization "re-invigorating and teaching cultural land burning and management." The album was funded by Palmer's supporters on Patreon.

Promotion
A cover of Midnight Oil's "Beds Are Burning" featuring Missy Higgins, Brian Viglione and Jherek Bischoff was released as a single on February 17, 2020. A benefit concert featuring Palmer and her husband Neil Gaiman was held in Melbourne, Australia on March 8, 2020.

Track listing

Personnel

Musicians
 Amanda Palmer – vocals (all tracks), piano (all tracks), autoharp (track 2), drums (track 3)
 Brian Viglione – drums (tracks 2, 6–8), tambourine (track 8)
 Jherek Bischoff – electric bass (tracks 2, 6, 8), guitar (tracks 2, 8), upright bass (tracks 4, 6, 7)
 Clare Bowditch – vocals (track 4)
 Montaigne – vocals (track 6)
 Fred Leone – didjeridoo (track 7)

Technical
 Artwork: Sarah Beetson
 Album layout: Andrew Nelson
 Engineer, co-producer, mixing: Anna Laverty at Sing Sing Studios in Melbourne, Australia
 Mix assistant: Gabby Crump and James Taplin
 Drum engineering: Jaron Luksa at The Rattle Room in Burbank, California
 Drum engineering assistants: Rylan Sunseri, Nathaniel Sellin, and Kahari Mays
 Bass and guitar engineering: Jherek Bischoff at Sweethaven in Los Angeles, CA
 Mastering: Ross Cockle at Sing Sing Studios
 Guest A&R, advisor, and co-producer: Xanthea O'Connor

References

2020 albums
Amanda Palmer albums
Charity albums
Crowdfunded albums
Bushfires in Australia
Collaborative albums